The November 2011 Myanmar earthquake was a magnitude 5.9 (Mw) moderate earthquake epicentered at Myanmar, about 130 km east of Manipur capital Imphal, India, on 21 November 2011 at 09:45 local time. The tremor was also felt in Indian states of Assam, Nagaland, Kolkata and some areas of north Bengal and in Bangladesh.

The region had previously experienced one of the worst earthquakes in 1897, measuring 8.1 on the Richter scale, that claimed the lives of over 1,500 people. Again in September 2011, more than 50 people died after a killer quake measuring 6.9 had shaken the region.

Earthquake 
The magnitude 5.9 (Mw) earthquake occurred inland at 09:45 local time on 21 November 2011 in Myanmar, which is about 130 km (80 miles) east of Imphal, Manipur, India. Mild tremors were felt across parts of Assam, Nagaland and Manipur, Kolkata and some areas of north Bengal parts of India, and also in Bangladesh.

The depth of the epicentre had resulted in lesser loss as compared to when it would be nearer the surface. No casualty or any damage was recorded immediate to the quake. However, in Guwahati, about 300 kilometres from the epicentre, homes were shaken for about 8–10 seconds at 08:46am (IST), which resulted in people running towards streets.

References

External links 
 November 2011 Myanmar earthquake at USGS

2011 earthquakes
2011 disasters in India
2011 in Myanmar
Earthquakes in Myanmar
Earthquakes in India